Parotocinclus jacumirim is a species of catfish in the family Loricariidae. It is native to South America, where it occurs in the Jacuípe River basin in Bahia, Brazil. The species reaches at least 5.07 cm (2 inches) SL and was described in 2020 by Dario Ernesto da Silva-Junior, Telton Pedro Anselmo Ramos, and Angela Maria Zanata based on fin morphology, dentition, and differences in plate coverage on the snout and abdomen. FishBase does not list this species.

References 

Otothyrinae
Taxa named by Telton Pedro Anselmo Ramos
Taxa named by Angela Maria Zanata 
Fish described in 2020